Baller may refer to:

People
 Adolph Baller (1909–1994), Austrian-American pianist
 Frederick W. Baller (1852–1922), British missionary
 Jay Baller (born 1960), American baseball player
 Kristian Baller (born 1984), Welsh rugby union player

Arts, entertainment, media and sports
Ballers, an HBO television series
NBA Ballers, a video game
Old School Ballers, an Indian 3x3 basketball team

Other uses
Baller, slang term for a basketball player, high roller, or ostentatiously successful person
AMT Hardballer, nicknamed "baller", a handgun